Impact Hub is a global network of locally-founded/-operated impact innovation incubators, accelerators, coworking spaces, and nonprofit organizations that collectively own and govern Impact Hub Company, based in Austria. Each local Impact Hub must comply with the protocols and policies voted on and approved by the members of the network, in a distributed global operating model.

Members of the network
Impact Hub Abidjan
Impact Hub Accra
Impact Hub Almaty
Impact Hub Athens
Impact Hub Amsterdam
Impact Hub Antigua
Impact Hub Austin
Impact Hub Baltimore
Impact Hub Bamako
Impact Hub Barcelona
Impact Hub Bari
Impact Hub Basel
Impact Hub Belgrade
Impact Hub Belo Horizonte
Impact Hub Berlin
Impact Hub Bern
Impact Hub Bogotá
Impact Hub Boston
Impact Hub Bradford
Impact Hub Brasilia
Impact Hub Bratislava
Impact Hub Brno
Impact Hub Bucharest
Impact Hub Budapest
Impact Hub Buenos Aires
Impact Hub Bujumbura
Impact Hub Caracas
Impact Hub Curitiba
Impact Hub Dakar
Impact Hub Dhaka
Impact Hub Donostia
Impact Hub Dresden
Impact Hub Florence
Impact Hub Florianopolis
Impact Hub Geneva
Impact Hub Hamburg
Impact Hub Harare
Impact Hub Houston: Impact Hub Houston is a 501(c)(3) non-profit organization established in Houston, Texas, United States. It provides entrepreneurial education, startup incubation and small business support, and is located at the Downtown Launchpad.
Impact Hub Islington (London)
Impact Hub Istanbul
Impact Hub Jakarta
Impact Hub Khartoum
Impact Hub Kigali
Impact Hub King's Cross (London)
Impact Hub Kuala Lumpur
Impact Hub Kyoto
Impact Hub Lagos
Impact Hub Lausanne
Impact Hub Leipzig
Impact Hub Liepāja
Impact Hub Lisbon
Impact Hub Lusaka
Impact Hub Madrid
Impact Hub Malaga
Impact Hub Managua
Impact Hub Manaus
Impact Hub Manila
Impact Hub Medellín
Impact Hub Mexico City
Impact Hub Milano
Impact Hub Minneapolis — Saint Paul
Impact Hub Monterrey
Impact Hub Montreal
Impact Hub Moscow
Impact Hub Munich
Impact Hub New York Metropolitan Area
Impact Hub Odessa
Impact Hub Ostrava
Impact Hub Ottawa
Impact Hub Phnom Penh
Impact Hub Prague
Impact Hub Reggio Emilia
Impact Hub Rio de Janeiro
Impact Hub Roma
Impact Hub Ruhr (Essen)
Impact Hub Salt Lake City
Impact Hub San Jose
Impact Hub San Salvador
Impact Hub Sao Paulo
Impact Hub Shanghai
Impact Hub Stockholm
Impact Hub Stuttgart
Impact Hub Syracuse
Impact Hub Taipei
Impact Hub Tbilisi
Impact Hub Tegucigalpa
Impact Hub Ticino (Lugano)
Impact Hub Tokyo
Impact Hub Torino
Impact Hub Trento
Impact Hub Vienna
Impact Hub Vigo
Impact Hub Vitória
Impact Hub Waikato
Impact Hub Yangon
Impact Hub Yerevan
Impact Hub Zagreb
Impact Hub Zaragoza
Impact Hub Zurich

See also 

 Coworking

References

Community centres
Entrepreneurship organizations
Organisations based in Vienna